Shen Xiling (1904 – 17 December 1940) was a Chinese film director.

Partial filmography

External links 

Film directors from Zhejiang
1904 births
1940 deaths
Artists from Hangzhou
Chinese film directors